Alamillo is an unincorporated community and census-designated place in Socorro County, New Mexico, United States. Its population was 102 as of the 2010 census. Interstate 25 passes through the community.

Geography

Demographics

Education
It is within Socorro Consolidated Schools. Socorro High School is the comprehensive high school of the district.

References

Census-designated places in New Mexico
Census-designated places in Socorro County, New Mexico